"Righteous Brothers", also titled "The Righteous Brothers" on the season 2 DVD, is the eighteenth episode and season finale of the second season of the American television sitcom Arrested Development. It originally aired on the Fox network in the United States on April 17, 2005. The episode, directed by Chuck Martin, was written by producer Jim Vallely and series creator and executive producer Mitchell Hurwitz. An extended version of the episode was released as a special feature on the DVD home release.

The episode received mostly positive reviews from critics. At the 57th Primetime Emmy Awards, Mitchell Hurwitz and Jim Vallely received the Outstanding Writing for a Comedy Series award for this episode.

Plot
Having been told that the house is sinking and that an inspector is on the way, Michael tells George Sr. that he needs to move out of the attic. Having made a music CD with his puppet Franklin, Gob asks Michael if he heard it. Michael assures Gob that he did. Realizing that George Sr. doesn't want to leave the attic, Gob knocks him out with ether, and drives him in the stair car to the police station to turn him in. Seeing that the Franklin CD he made for Michael hasn't been opened, Gob makes it seem as if Michael drove George Sr. to the station. After signing an affidavit stating that he doesn't know where his father is, Michael is arrested after a security camera photo shows Gob holding a picture of Michael on his face, making it seem as if Michael had met with his father earlier in the day.

Meanwhile, George Michael and Ann protest the American remake of the film Les Cousins Dangereux, in which two cousins fall in love. Maeby, who created the remake, is told by producers to cut down the movie into a mere 52 minutes. At home, George Michael and Maeby share a kiss on the living room couch, and after jokingly saying that they "didn't get swallowed up into hell," the house fully sInks. Gob arrives, wanting to retrieve his father who he put underground the house, only to realize George Sr. had escaped earlier in the day.

Earlier, George Sr., having escaped, knocked out his brother Oscar, shaved his head, and placed him in the police station's bathroom. He then witnessed Gob arriving outside the police station and starting a fight with Michael. George Sr., stopping the fight, stated that he was turning himself in, only to lead the cops into the bathroom where Oscar was located, which resulted in Oscar being arrested.

On the next Arrested Development...
Having burnt his hands on the family Cornballer, which erased his fingerprints, Oscar has trouble explaining to the cops who he really is. Having broken up with Lindsay, Tobias decides to quit his job at the Bluth Company and move to Las Vegas with his new girlfriend Kitty. Having arrived at Las Vegas, Tobias is told that his dream job has been filled in by a mysterious man, who happens to be George Sr.

Reception

Critical reception
The A.V. Club writer Noel Murray wrote that the season finale didn't feel much like a finale, saying that "there’s a fumbling-for-an-ending aspect to “Righteous Brothers” that keeps it from being one of the classic Arrested Developments. Chalk it up to the reduced episode order, which makes this finale feel like a big finish and just an ordinary episode, all at once." In 2019, Brian Tallerico, writing for Vulture, ranked the episode 42nd out of the 84 total episodes of Arrested Development.

Accolades
"Righteous Brothers" was honored at the 57th Primetime Emmy Awards. Mitchell Hurwitz and Jim Vallely received the Outstanding Writing for a Comedy Series award for writing the episode, and Jeffrey Tambor was nominated for the Outstanding Supporting Actor in a Comedy Series award for his supporting role as George Bluth Sr.

References

External links
 

Arrested Development episodes
2005 American television episodes
Emmy Award-winning episodes